Momand may refer to:

 Abdul Ahad Momand, Afghan Pilot/Cosmonaut.
 Farida Momand (born 1965), Afghan politician
 Mohabat Momand (born 1995), Afghan cricketer
 Mohammad Gul Khan Momand (1885–1964), Afghan politician
 Qalandar Momand (1930–2003), Pakistani writer
 Wafadar Momand (born 2000), Afghan cricketer

See also
 Momand Dara District, a district in Nangarhar Province, Afghanistan
 Momand, a Pashtun tribe
 Abdul Ahad Mohmand (born 1959), Afghan aviator